Ichiro Suzuki (born 1973) is a professional baseball player.

Ichiro Suzuki is also the name of:
 Ichiro Suzuki (engineer) (born 1937), Japanese automotive engineer responsible for the design and construction of the first Lexus LS
 Ichiro Suzuki (footballer) (born 1995), Japanese football player